Nogometni klub Rudar Velenje, commonly referred to as NK Rudar Velenje or simply Rudar Velenje, is a Slovenian football club from Velenje which competes in the Slovenian Second League.

History

The club was founded in August 1948. At first they played in local MNZ Celje league, until they qualified for the Slovenian Republic League in 1953. Two years later, on 3 July 1955, Rudar's home stadium Ob Jezeru was opened and the club moved to its current home. After the short crisis the club returned to the Slovenian league in 1962. For the 1974–75 season the club hired a professional coach Živko Stakič and became Slovenian champions in 1977. Rudar therefore qualified for the Yugoslav Second League, where they played until 1982. Just before the breakup of Yugoslavia, Rudar became the Slovenian champion for the second time in 1991.

After the Slovenian independence, Rudar became a regular participant in the Slovenian PrvaLiga. They were relegated to the Slovenian Second League in 2003 and returned for the 2005–06 season, but were instantly relegated back to second level. In the 2007–08 season they finished first and thus achieved a promotion back to the first league. The club's highest finish was third place on four occasions, the last time in 2014, when Mate Eterović, Rudar's striker, also became league's topscorer. Their biggest success was winning the Slovenian Cup in 1998, when they lost first game away to Primorje, but then won 3–0 in front of home crowd in the second leg. Rudar therefore played in the last edition of UEFA Cup Winners' Cup, where it was eliminated by Varteks in the first round.

Honours

Yugoslavia
Slovenian Republic League
 Winners: 1976–77, 1990–91

Slovenian Republic Cup
 Winners: 1979–80

Slovenia
Slovenian Second League
 Winners: 2003–04, 2004–05, 2007–08

Slovenian Cup
 Winners: 1997–98

MNZ Celje Cup
 Winners: 1991–92, 2003–04, 2004–05

Domestic league and cup results

*Best results are highlighted.

UEFA competitions
All results (home and away) list Rudar's goal tally first.

GR2 = Group 2; QR = Qualifying round; R1 = First round; R2 = Second round; QR1 = First qualifying round; QR2 = Second qualifying round.

References

External links
Official website 
PrvaLiga profile 

 
Association football clubs established in 1948
Football clubs in Slovenia
Football clubs in Yugoslavia
1948 establishments in Slovenia
Sport in Velenje
Velenje